Scooby-Doo! Return to Zombie Island is an American animated direct-to-video supernatural comedy mystery film produced by Warner Bros. Animation and distributed by Warner Bros. Home Entertainment. It is the thirty-third entry in the direct-to-video series of Scooby-Doo films and a direct sequel to the 1998 direct-to-video animated film Scooby-Doo on Zombie Island, the first film in the Scooby-Doo direct-to-video franchise. The film premiered at the San Diego Comic-Con on July 21, 2019, followed by a digital release on September 3, 2019, and a DVD release on October 1, 2019.

Plot
The gang lure a werewolf in a trap and catch the culprit: Young Man Withers. Soon after cleaning the Mystery Machine, the gang capture more monsters, including the Snow Ghost, the Creeper, and the Spooky Space Kook, who are the entire Withers family. But, as the gang congratulate themselves, the Mystery Machine goes backwards, prompting Fred to give chase before discovering that it was just a dream. As it turns out, Fred sold the Mystery Machine, and they are retired from mystery solving, thanks to the Sheriff from the 13th Ghost incident. Fred decides to come out of retirement after seeing a news report, though Shaggy and Scooby refuse, saying that they've been taken for granted in all their mysteries. The pair make Fred, Daphne, and Velma promise never to solve another mystery. The gang decide to have a vacation and soon see a TV program featuring Elvira, who announces that Shaggy Rogers is the winner of a tropical vacation, much to the gang's confusion and Shaggy and Scooby's delight.

On the way to the island via ferry, Fred, Daphne, and Velma try to keep their promise as Shaggy and Scooby relax. After arriving, two greeters frightfully tell the gang to "Get Out" but get humorously ignored by the gang as they go in a van to the resort, with the two greeters saying "Tourists…" in a annoyed tone. On the way, a clawed figure slashes a palm tree causing it to block the road. forcing the gang to go to the resort by foot while the van driver stays to repair his van. Arriving at Moonstar Island Resort, they are reminded of Moonscar Island, where they solved a mystery involving the zombies and Cat Creatures. Inside the resort, they meet the Hotel Manager, Alan, and the hotel staff, composed of Mona, Linda, Jack, and Bugbite Stubbs, who resemble the people the gang previously encountered on Moonscar. While enjoying the accommodations, a few zombies surprise Scooby and Shaggy, who make a run for it and hide in a cabinet, which ultimately leads to a cavern, complete with cat statues and monuments.

Soon, Shaggy and Scooby return to the hotel and barricade the door, as a group of zombies approach the hotel. Shaggy and Scooby give their OK to the others to solve mysteries again and the gang set a trap for the zombies. But the clawed figure, a black Were-Cat, knocks over a candelabra, setting fire to a curtain, which then causes the sprinkler system to douse the fire and melt the zombies' faces to reveal that they were the hotel staff in disguise. The gang discover that they actually are on Moonscar Island, which is doubling as a filming location. Alan confesses to the gang that he's a film director known as Alan Smithee, who wanted to make a scary movie after looking into Velma's unsolved mysteries blog. He also revealed that he sponsored the vacation for Shaggy to win, but states that he had no knowledge of the black werecat. Despite everything that happened, the gang offer to help Alan finish the movie. As filming continues, the gang meet Seaver, a stunt double for Fred, who has a monster truck version of the Mystery Machine. As the sun goes down, Velma heads into the forest wearing night-vision goggles but runs away when she sees a cluster of cats' eyes.

After Velma tells the others to make a run for their lives, they see a harmless-looking beige kitten coming out of the bushes, startling Scooby. Just as Shaggy assures Scooby that there's nothing to worry about, the kitten (fully grown in an instant) turns feral and roars like a tiger, scaring Shaggy as more cats attack. After the movie crew (except Alan and Seaver) hide, three were-cats appear. As the gang and Seaver run for the ferry, Alan crazily burns it. Fred, acting on impulse, rescues the Mystery Machine from being burned with the Ferry. Fred tells the others to get in, but one of the cat creatures tries to grab Smithee's medallion, which is Simone's pendant. The gang save Alan and the pendant and the cats and cat creatures pursue them back to the resort. After a wild chase, the gang hide in the cabinet Shaggy and Scooby hid in, leading them to the cavern where the were-cats tried to drain the gang's life force. They notice that there are a lot of holes in the cave, which gives Velma an idea. The three cat creatures enter the cavern, find the medallion, and place it on the pedestal in the light of the harvest moon. The light is reflected to specific spot on the ground where the cat creatures dig until they find a chest that appears to be filled with gold coins, though its contents turn out to be Scooby snacks covered in gold foil. The cats are attacked by the gang, disguised to resemble zombies, causing them to become scared and hide in one of the cave's holes. The gang unmask the creatures, revealing them to be the greeters and the ferry captain. The trio intended to find Moonscar's treasure, using cat whistles to control the island cats to deter anyone who were getting too close. The fourth werecat (the one who attacked the van and tried to set fire in the mansion) remains at large. After the police take the culprits away, Alan despairs that his movie doesn't have a finale.

Soon, the cats, now docile, enter the cave and dig a spot in the ground with Scooby's help, revealing another treasure chest. Alan opens it and sees real gold inside, and declares that he's done with movie business and is retiring with all the gold. The gang declare that they'll continue solving mysteries. Though the sheriff arrives and berates the gang for solving mysteries again, he relents, allowing Mystery Inc. to return. Shaggy and Scooby, along with the six cats who dug up Moonscar's treasure, eat the gold foiled Scooby snacks.

Elvira tells the viewers about the movie, Zombie Teenagers and the Island of Doom, including a trailer and outtakes.

Voice cast
 Frank Welker as Scooby-Doo, Fred Jones
 Grey Griffin as Daphne Blake
 Matthew Lillard as Shaggy Rogers
 Kate Micucci as Velma Dinkley
 Janell Cox as Cat Person, Sister Withers
 David Herman as Jack, Sheriff
 John Michael Higgins as Alan Smithee
 Dave B. Mitchell as Driver, Ferry Captain
 Cassandra Peterson as Elvira
 Roger Rose as Lead Cat Person, Narrator
 Travis Willingham as Seaver

References

External links
 

2010s English-language films
2010s American animated films
2010s supernatural films
2010s children's animated films
Films based on television series
Warner Bros. Animation animated films
Warner Bros. direct-to-video animated films
2019 direct-to-video films
2019 animated films
2019 films
American children's animated mystery films
American children's animated comedy films
American mystery films
Warner Bros. direct-to-video films
Scooby-Doo direct-to-video animated films
American zombie comedy films
Films set in 2019
Films set on fictional islands
American direct-to-video films
American comedy horror films
2010s children's comedy films
Films produced by Sam Register
2019 comedy films
Films directed by Cecilia Aranovich